Friedensburg is a census-designated place (CDP) in Schuylkill County, Pennsylvania, United States. The population was 828 at the time of the 2000 census.

Geography
Friedensburg is located at  (40.604343, -76.229900).

Demographics

At the 2000 census there were 828 people, 375 households, and 241 families living in the CDP. The population density was 527.2 people per square mile (203.6/km). There were 414 housing units at an average density of 263.6/sq mi (101.8/km). The racial makeup of the CDP was 99.52% White, 0.12% Native American, 0.12% from other races, and 0.24% from two or more races. Hispanic or Latino of any race were 0.60%.

Of the 375 households 23.2% had children under the age of 18 living with them, 50.7% were married couples living together, 8.5% had a female householder with no husband present, and 35.7% were non-families. 31.5% of households were one person and 16.0% were one person aged 65 or older. The average household size was 2.21 and the average family size was 2.70.

The age distribution was 19.8% under the age of 18, 5.6% from 18 to 24, 29.1% from 25 to 44, 25.4% from 45 to 64, and 20.2% 65 or older. The median age was 42 years. For every 100 females, there were 103.9 males. For every 100 females age 18 and over, there were 97.0 males.

The median household income was $33,625 and the median family income was $48,750. Males had a median income of $28,173 versus $25,714 for females. The per capita income for the CDP was $19,039. None of the families and 4.0% of the population were living below the poverty line, including no under eighteens and 4.5% of those over 64.

References

Census-designated places in Schuylkill County, Pennsylvania
Census-designated places in Pennsylvania